The 2016 European Wrestling Championships were held in Riga, Latvia, from 8 March to 13 March 2016.

Medal overview

Medal table

Team ranking

Men's freestyle

Men's Greco-Roman

Women's freestyle

References

External links
 Official site

 
European Wrestling Championships
Europe
Wrestling
Sports competitions in Riga
Wrestling Championships
Wrestling
Wrestling
March 2016 sports events in Europe
21st century in Riga